Ōrākei is a suburb of Auckland city, in the North Island of New Zealand. It is located on a peninsula five kilometres to the east of the city centre, on the shore of the Waitematā Harbour, which lies to the north, and Hobson Bay and Ōrākei Basin, two arms of the Waitematā, which lie to the west and south. To the east is the suburb of Mission Bay. Takaparawhau / Bastion Point is a coastal piece of land in Ōrākei. Between Takaparawhau and Paritai Drive is Ōkahu Bay and Reserve.

Overview
The New Zealand Ministry for Culture and Heritage gives a translation of "place of adornment" for the Māori name of Ōrākei.

Takaparawhau / Bastion Point is the location of Ōrākei Marae and its Tumutumuwhenua wharenui (meeting house) is a traditional tribal meeting ground for the Ngāti Whātua iwi (tribe) and their Ngāti Whātua Ōrākei, Ngā Oho, Te Taoū and Te Uri hapū (sub-tribes). In the 1940s, the Ōrākei pā (village) was one of the last places where traditional pre-European kūmara cultivars (either hutihuti or rekamaroa) were grown.

Takaparawhau / Bastion Point is also the location of the Savage Memorial, the tomb and memorial garden for Michael Joseph Savage, the first Labour Party prime minister of New Zealand and one of the country's most popular prime ministers, who died in office in 1940. The Art Deco ensemble designed by Tibor Donner and Anthony Bartlett was officially opened in March 1943 and has expansive views of the Waitemata Harbour.

History 
The Ōrākei block was historically occupied by Ngāti Whātua Ōrākei, and before the colonisation of New Zealand it was part of important lands for the hapū, overlooking rich fishing and farming areas. The land was confiscated by the New Zealand Government for public works and development over a period stretching from the 1840s into the 1950s.

Ōrākei was the first location where the New Zealand Flying School operated from between October and November 1915, before moving to Mission Bay, and a permanent location at Kohimarama in 1916.

In 1936-37 John A. Lee proposed to evict the 120 Māori living in the foreshore pā at Takaparawhau / Bastion Point and to include the land in the proposed Ōrākei state housing scheme; the proposal (seen as using Māori land as a park for white children) attracted many local objections (including Robin Hyde in No More Dancing at Orakei) and was reversed by Prime Minister Savage on his return from overseas.

In 1976 the Crown announced that it planned to develop Bastion Point by selling it to the highest bidder for high-income housing. Ngāti Whātua Ōrākei, and other activists, formed the Ōrākei Māori Action Committee, taking direct action to stop the subdivision. In 1977–1978 the Ōrākei Māori Action Committee organised an occupation of the remaining Crown land that lasted for 506 days. The occupation and the use of force to end it played a part in highlighting injustices against Māori, and the occupation became a major landmark in the history of Māori protest.

In 1988 the New Zealand Labour Government returned Takaparawhau / Bastion Point and Ōrākei Marae to Ngāti Whātua Ōrākei, with compensation, as part of a Treaty of Waitangi settlement process.

Under the 1991 Orakei Act, parts of Takaparawhau, including the marae, church, and now developed land, were reserved for Ngāti Whātua Ōrākei. The rest of Takaparawhau, Ōkahu Reserve and the foreshore land were set aside "as Maori reservation ... for the common use and benefit of the members of the hapu and the citizens of the City of Auckland". Collectively called the Whenua Rangatira (noble or chiefly land), these areas are administered by the Ngāti Whātua Ōrākei Reserves Board, equally represented by Ngāti Whātua Ōrākei and Auckland Council.

Demographics

Ōrākei had a population of 5,625 at the 2018 New Zealand census, an increase of 150 people (2.7%) since the 2013 census, and an increase of 273 people (5.1%) since the 2006 census. There were 2,073 households, comprising 2,676 males and 2,946 females, giving a sex ratio of 0.91 males per female, with 909 people (16.2%) aged under 15 years, 1,089 (19.4%) aged 15 to 29, 2,673 (47.5%) aged 30 to 64, and 954 (17.0%) aged 65 or older.

Ethnicities were 70.3% European/Pākehā, 18.8% Māori, 6.9% Pacific peoples, 13.9% Asian, and 3.6% other ethnicities. People may identify with more than one ethnicity.

The percentage of people born overseas was 30.4, compared with 27.1% nationally.

Although some people chose not to answer the census's question about religious affiliation, 45.9% had no religion, 37.8% were Christian, 3.3% had Māori religious beliefs, 1.0% were Hindu, 2.2% were Muslim, 1.0% were Buddhist and 2.9% had other religions.

Of those at least 15 years old, 1,890 (40.1%) people had a bachelor's or higher degree, and 450 (9.5%) people had no formal qualifications. 1,506 people (31.9%) earned over $70,000 compared to 17.2% nationally. The employment status of those at least 15 was that 2,394 (50.8%) people were employed full-time, 663 (14.1%) were part-time, and 189 (4.0%) were unemployed.

Education
Selwyn College is a secondary school (years 9–13) with a roll of 1378.

All these schools are co-educational. Rolls are as of

See also 
 Ngāti Whātua Ōrākei
 Takaparawhau / Bastion Point
 Ōrākei railway station

References

 Colonial Architecture in New Zealand. John Stacpoole. A.H & A.W Reed 1976
 Decently And in Order, The Centennial History of the Auckland City Council. G.W.A Bush. Collins 1971.

External links
 Photographs of Orakei held in Auckland Libraries' heritage collections.

Suburbs of Auckland
Populated places around the Waitematā Harbour
Ngāti Whātua Ōrākei
Ōrākei Local Board Area